Dmytro Kostiantynovych Kirpulyanskyy (born June 2, 1985 in Makiivka) is a two-time Olympic modern pentathlete from Ukraine. He also won an individual bronze medal at the 2009 World Modern Pentathlon Championships in London, England.

Career
Kirpulyanskyy achieved his best results and performed consistently for the men's event at the Olympics, when he finished ninth in 2008. At the 2012 Summer Olympics in London, however, he slapped his horse Wonderboy after the horse almost threw him, and then fell off him during the horse-riding segment. Following his sudden fall and unsuccessful attempt to finish the riding course, Kirpulyanskyy dropped to thirty-fifth place in the overall standings.

Kirpulyanskyy works as a doctor with a degree in medicine at the Donetsk National Medical University. He is a member of Dynamo Donetsk, currently coached by his Konstantin.

References

External links
 

Ukrainian male modern pentathletes
1985 births
Living people
Olympic modern pentathletes of Ukraine
Modern pentathletes at the 2008 Summer Olympics
Modern pentathletes at the 2012 Summer Olympics
Sportspeople from Donetsk
World Modern Pentathlon Championships medalists